Sri Sairam Engineering College is an engineering institution located in the suburbs of Chennai, Tamil Nadu, India. It was established in 1995 by Leo Muthu founder chairman of Leo Muthu Educational Trust. The college is self-financing and autonomous college in Chennai.

Rankings

The National Institutional Ranking Framework (NIRF) ranked it 108 among engineering colleges in 2020.

References

External links

Engineering colleges in Chennai